Benoît Lutgen (born 10 March 1970) is a Belgian politician who served as head of the Centre démocrate humaniste (Humanist Democrat Centre) political party in Belgium from 2011 to 2019.

Early life
Benoît Lutgen was born on 10 March 1970 in Bastogne. His father was Guy Lutgen.

Political career
Previously, Lutgen was Secretary-General of the Centre démocrate humaniste from 2001 to 2002 and National Campaign Director for the party in 2004. Lutgen was Minister for Public Works, Agriculture, Rural Affairs, Nature, Forests and Heritage of Wallonia. He was previously Minister for Agriculture, Rural Affairs, the Environment and Tourism from 2004 to 2009.

Lutgen has been a Member of the European Parliament since the 2019 elections. He has since been serving on the Committee on Transport and Tourism. In addition to his committee assignments, he is part of the Parliament's delegation with the United States. He is also a member of the European Parliament Intergroup on Disability and the European Parliament Intergroup on the Welfare and Conservation of Animals.

References

External links

Members of the Chamber of Representatives (Belgium)
Centre démocrate humaniste MEPs
1970 births
Living people
Ministers of Agriculture of Belgium
MEPs for Belgium 2019–2024
Members of the Parliament of Wallonia
People from Bastogne
Mayors of places in Belgium
Government ministers of Wallonia